Thomas Grenville Jones (23 July 1922 – 2 February 2000), was a Welsh political consultant and Liberal Party politician.

Background
He was educated at Llandrindod Wells, Tonbridge School and St. Catharine's College, Cambridge. In 1966 he married Jill Pound-Corner.

Professional career
Jones served as a wireless operator/air gunner in the war. After completing his law exams in 1950 he was admitted into the Middle Temple. He worked as a journalist. He worked on the Crossbencher column of the Sunday Express. He became a senior partner in a firm of commercial advisers.

Political career
Jones was President of Cambridge University Liberal Club in 1949. He was Liberal candidate for the Isle of Ely division of Cambridgeshire at the 1950 General Election. He was Liberal candidate for the Leominster division of Herefordshire at the 1959 General Election. He was Liberal candidate for the Tavistock division of Devon at the 1964 General Election. He did not stand for parliament again.

Electoral record

References

1922 births
2000 deaths
Liberal Party (UK) parliamentary candidates
People educated at Tonbridge School
Alumni of St Catharine's College, Cambridge
Members of the Middle Temple
Royal Air Force personnel of World War II